Milivoje "Mića" Tomić (10 February 1920 – 23 August 2000) was a Serbian actor. 

Tomić won numerous awards during his career, including the "Pavle Vuisic" Lifetime Achievement Award in 1997.

Selected filmography

References

External links

1920 births
2000 deaths
Male actors from Belgrade
Serbian male film actors
20th-century Serbian male actors
Yugoslav male actors